Kolačno is a small settlement in the Municipality of Slovenske Konjice in eastern Slovenia. It lies in the hills north of Loče and was traditionally part of Styria. The municipality is now included in the Savinja Statistical Region.

References

External links
Kolačno at Geopedia

Populated places in the Municipality of Slovenske Konjice